Rodrigo Antonio González Catalán (born 30 November 1995) is a Chilean footballer who currently plays as a defender for Primera B side Santiago Morning.

Career
After staying in the Youth Teams of Palestino and Santiago Wanderers, he played for General Velásquez, Colchagua and Chimbarongo F.C. at the Tercera A, the fourth level of the Chilean football. Along with Colchagua, he won the 2014 Tercera A Championship.

In the Summer 2016, he joined San Luis de Quillota in the Chilean Primera División, first playing at the under-19 level and making his professional debut in a match against Palestino on August 21, 2016. After San Luis was relegated to Primera B, he was loaned to Unión Española for the 2019 season, returning on second half 2020 after his stay on loan at Unión La Calera. For the 2021 Primera B, he returned to San Luis.

Personal life
He is nicknamed Huaso, like the traditional countryman of the Central Chile, due to the fact his birthplace is San Vicente de Tagua Tagua, a city in the O'Higgins Region.

Honours
Colchagua
 Tercera A (1): 2014

References

External links
 
 
 Rodrigo González at playmakerstats.com (English version of ceroacero.es)

Living people
1995 births
People from Cachapoal Province
Chilean footballers
Chilean Primera División players
Primera B de Chile players
General Velásquez footballers
Deportes Colchagua footballers
San Luis de Quillota footballers
Unión Española footballers
Unión La Calera footballers
Santiago Morning footballers
Association football defenders